Miraciidae is a family of copepods in the family Miraciidae.

Subdivisions 
The World Register of Marine Species lists the following genera as accepted within Miraciidae, subdivided into three subfamilies.

References

Harpacticoida
Crustaceans described in 1846
Crustacean families